Rohana parvata, the brown prince, is an Indomalayan butterfly of the family Nymphalidae. The species was first described by Frederic Moore in 1857. It is found from Sikkim to Assam, Bhutan and Nepal. The subspecies R. p. burmana (Tytler, 1940) is found in Myanmar.

References 

Butterflies described in 1857